Pascual Beká Elebiyó Eyang (born 17 August 1999), known as Pascual and Nasty, is an Equatoguinean footballer who plays as a goalkeeper for Liga Nacional de Fútbol club Cano Sport Academy and the Equatorial Guinea national team.

International career
Pascual made his international debut for Equatorial Guinea in 2018.

References

1999 births
Living people
People from Ebibeyin
Equatoguinean footballers
Association football goalkeepers
Cano Sport Academy players
Equatorial Guinea international footballers
Equatorial Guinea A' international footballers
2018 African Nations Championship players